The following is a list of individuals associated with Wellesley College through attending as a student, or serving as a member of the faculty or staff. Dates indicate the year of graduation.

Notable alumnae

Academia
 Virginia Abernethy, class of 1955 – academic anthropologist, involved in politics
 Myrtilla Avery, class of 1891 – an American classical scholar focused on Medieval art, former chair of Department of Art at Wellesley College and director of the Farnsworth Art Museum from 1930–1937. Introduced the first art history classes at Wellesley & the earliest museum studies courses.
 Michele Moody-Adams, class of 1978 – dean, Columbia College
 Carole B. Balin, class of 1986 – professor of Jewish history
 Patricia Bizzell, class of 1970 – professor of English
 Victoria Budson, class of 1993 – Founder of Women and Public Policy Program at the Harvard Kennedy School, one of CNN's "Ten Visionary Women"
 Claudia Lauper Bushman, class of 1956 – historian
 Anita Calvert Lebourgeoise – attorney, judge, genealogist, biographer and women's suffrage orator
 Margaret Clapp, class of 1930 – former president of Wellesley College (1949-1960) and winner of the Pulitzer Prize for Biography.
Miriam DeCosta-Willis, class of 1956 – Romance language scholar, civil rights activist, and first Black professor at Memphis State University
 Frances Daly Fergusson, class of 1965 – former president of Vassar College.
 Juliet Floyd, class of 1982 – professor of Philosophy
 Margaret Henderson Floyd, class of 1953 – art historian and professor
 Susan Armitage, class of 1959 – historian
 Susan Foh – American biblical scholar
 Cecilia Conrad, class of 1976 – economics professor, dean of Pomona College
 Barbara Fraumeni, class of 1972 – economist
Grace Andrews, class of 1890 – mathematician and professor
Phyllis Fox, class of 1944 – mathematician and computer scientist
 Grace Frick, class of 1925 – linguistics scholar 
 Marjorie Grene, class of 1931 – philosopher, one of the first philosophers to raise questions about the synthetic theory of evolution
 Carolyn Gold Heilbrun, class of 1947 – professor of English literature at Columbia University, and mystery novelist under the name "Amanda Cross"
 Ayesha Jalal, class of 1978 – historian, 1998 MacArthur Foundation Fellowship
 Theodora J. Kalikow, class of 1962 – former president, University of Maine at Farmington and University of Southern Maine
 Amalie Kass, class of 1949 – historian
 Yoshi Kasuya, class of 1923 – educator, former president of Tsuda University
 Amy Kelly, educator, historian, best-selling author
 Nannerl O. Keohane, class of 1961 – political theorist. President, Wellesley College and Duke University
 Jean Kilbourne, class of 1964 – author, expert on the image of women in advertising
 Rosalind E. Krauss, class of 1962 – art critic, professor, theorist
 Mary Lefkowitz, class of 1957 – classical scholar
 Helen Lefkowitz Horowitz, class of 1963 – historian
 Phyllis Williams Lehmann, class of 1934 – archaeologist
 Helen Abbot Merrill, class of 1886 – mathematician
 Winifred Edgerton Merrill, class of 1883 – mathematician, first woman to receive a PhD in mathematics
 Ellen Fitz Pendleton, class of 1886 – mathematician, former president of Wellesley College
 Karen Remmer, class of 1966 – political scientist
 Carol Sanger, class of 1970 – reproductive rights expert, professor at Columbia Law School
 Kay Lehman Schlozman, class of 1968 – political scientist
 Mary Lyndon Shanley, class of 1966 – legal scholar, professor of political science at Vassar College
 Jennifer S. Thaler, class of 1993 – professor of Entomology at Cornell University
 Ellen Umansky, class of 1972 – professor of Judaic studies
 Diana Chapman Walsh, class of 1966 – former president, Wellesley College
 Ernestine Wiedenbach, class of 1922 – nursing theorist
 Patricia J. Williams, class of 1972 – law professor at Columbia University, recipient of the MacArthur Foundation Fellowship
 Roxana Vivian, class of 1894 – mathematics professor at Wellesley College, the first in her department to hold a doctorate, and Hartwick College.
 Eliza Newkirk Rogers, class of 1900 – art history professor at Wellesley College and Mount Holyoke College, she shaped the art history department at Wellesley, she donated her art collection to the Davis Museum at Wellesley College, and left behind "The Eliza Newkirk Rogers Prize for Architecture" at Wellesley.

Art and design
 Anne Fougeron, class of 1977 – architect, B.A. in architectural history. 
 Molly Bang, class of 1965 – illustrator.
 Ann Beha, class of 1972 – founder and principal, Ann Beha Architects committed to historic preservation. 
 Anita Berrizbeitia, class of 1980 – landscape architect and chair of the Harvard Graduate School of Design's Department of Landscape Architecture
 Anna Campbell Bliss, class of 1946 – artist and architect
 Emilie Benes Brzezinski, class of 1953 – sculptor, wife of Zbigniew Brzezinski
 Mildred Codding – medical illustrator
 Katherine K. Davis, class of 1914 – composer, pianist, and author of the famous Christmas tune "The Little Drummer Boy"
 Patricia Degener (1924–2008) – American ceramic artist
 Victorine du Pont Homsey, class of 1923 – architect and Fellow of the American Institute of Architects 
 Mary Rockwell Hook, class of 1900 – architect
 Julia Kunin, class of 1983 – sculptor, video artist
 Juliette May Fraser, class of 1909 – artist, muralist 
 Leila Daw, class of 1962 – installation artist 
 Lorraine O'Grady, class of 1955 – conceptual artist and art critic
 Jennifer Maestre, class of 1981 – sculptor
 Eleanor Raymond, class of 1909 – architect, designed and built the first occupied solar-powered house in the US
 Elizabeth Barlow Rogers, class of 1957 – urban planner, landscape architect

Business
 Mary McDuffie, – President/CEO of Navy Federal Credit Union
 Mary Cunningham Agee, class of 1973 – president, The Nurturing Network
 Robin Chase, class of 1980 – co-founder of Zipcar
 Elisabeth DeMarse, class of 1976 – former CEO, Chairman, and President of TheStreet.Com
 Heather Higgins, class of 1981 – nonprofit executive, political commentator
 Lois Juliber, class of 1971 – vice chairman of Colgate-Palmolive
 Elizabeth Parr-Johnston, class of 1961 – economist
 Priya Paul, class of 1988 – Chairman of Park Hotels, Head of Apeejay Surendra Group, also Trustee of Wellesley College
 Marion Sandler, class of 1952 – CEO and founder of Golden West Financial
 Anne Toth, class of 1993 – privacy and policy executive, former Chief Trust Officer of Yahoo
 Susan Wagner, class of 1982 – founder and former COO of BlackRock and board member of Apple Inc. 
 Joan Wallace-Benjamin, class of 1975 – CEO of The Home for Little Wanderers
 Vicky Tsai, class of 2000 – CEO and founder of Tatcha

Government and public service
 Eleanor D. Acheson, 1969 – former Assistant Attorney General of the United States
 Bertha Adkins, 1928 – former Undersecretary of Health, Education, and Welfare 
 Madeleine Albright, 1959 – former United States Secretary of State 
Emily Sophie Brown, 1904 – one of the first women to serve in the Connecticut House of Representatives 
 Annette Baker Fox, 1934 – international relations advisor
 Carolina Barco Isakson, 1973 – Colombian Foreign Minister 2002–2006, Ambassador to the US, 2006–2010. 
 Jane Bolin, 1928 – First African-American woman to become a judge
 Sophonisba Breckinridge, 1888 – activist
 Anita B. Brody, 1955 – judge of the United States District Court for the Eastern District of Pennsylvania
 Janath R. Cannon, 1939 – counselor to the Relief Society of the Church of Jesus Christ of Latter-day Saints
 Wilma Chan, 1971 – California Democrat
 Gail Chang Bohr, 1966 – former Minnesota judge
 Harriette L. Chandler, 1959 – President of the Massachusetts Senate.
 Soong Mei-ling (Madame Chiang Kai-Shek), 1917 – former First Lady of the Republic of China 
 Marguerite S. Church, 1915 – U.S. Representative from Illinois 
 Esther Clenott, 1945 – American politician from Maine, former two-term mayor of Portland and state representative 
 Hillary Clinton, 1969 – former United States Secretary of State, former U.S. Senator (D-New York), former First Lady of the United States 
 Deborah Cochran, 1960 – Congresswoman from Massachusetts
 Jan Coggeshall, mayor of Galveston
 Elinor G. Constable, 1955 - diplomat, U.S. Ambassador to Kenya 
 Rita Crocker Clements – former First Lady of the U.S. state of Texas 
 Ophelia Dahl, 1994 – executive director of Partners in Health, daughter of children's author Roald Dahl and actress Patricia Neal
 Molly Dewson, 1897 – feminist, political activist
 Diana DiZoglio, 2010 – Massachusetts State Representative (D-14th Essex District)
 Christine Durham, 1967 – chief justice, Utah Supreme Court
 Virginia Durr, 1925 – civil rights activist
 Carolyn Dykema, 1989 – former Massachusetts State Representative
 Susan Estrich, 1974 –  lawyer, professor, author, feminist advocate and commentator for Fox News
 Colette Flesch, 1960 – Luxembourg politician and Olympic fencer
 Loletta Fyan, 1915 – first librarian in Michigan
 Cynthia Glassman, 1967 – commissioner of the SEC
 Susan P. Graber, 1969 – circuit judge, United States Court of Appeals for the Ninth Circuit
 Wendy Lee Gramm, 1966 – economist, former director of ENRON
 Jean Constance Hamilton, 1968 – judge of the United States District Court for the Eastern District of Missouri
 Aurelia Harwood – philanthropist, former president of Sierra Club 
 Ellen Segal Huvelle, 1970 – judge of the United States District Court for the District of Columbia
 Farahnaz Ispahani, 1985 – member of Pakistan's parliament, spokesperson for the president of Pakistan, journalist
 Carol E. Jackson, 1973 – judge of the United States District Court for the Eastern District of Missouri
 Katie Johnson, 2003 – personal secretary to President Barack Obama
 Amalya Lyle Kearse, 1959 – judge of the United States Court of Appeals for the Second Circuit, five time U.S. Champion bridge player
 Leslie E. Kobayashi 1979 – judge of the United States District Court for the District of Hawaii
 Nancy K. Kopp, 1965 – Treasurer of Maryland
 M. Hannah Lauck, 1986 – judge of the United States District Court for the Eastern District of Virginia
 Gail Laughlin, 1894 – first woman from Maine to practice law and founder of the National League for Women's Service
 Henrietta Wells Livermore, 1887 – suffragette
 Sandra L. Lynch, 1968 – chief judge, United States Court of Appeals for the First Circuit
Yukiko Maki, 1924 – Japanese educator, Fulbright officer, worked in international exchange
 Nora Margaret Manella, 1972 – presiding justice of the California Second District Court of Appeal, Division Four, former judge of the United States District Court for the Central District of California
 Chirlane McCray, 1975 – public affairs activist, First Lady of New York City
 Ida Craven Merriam, 1925 – statistician for the Social Security Administration
 Lindsey Miller-Lerman, 1968 – justice, Nebraska Supreme Court
 Mary V. Mochary, 1963 – attorney and Republican politician, formerly mayor of Montclair, New Jersey
 Helen Barrett Montgomery, 1884 – women's rights activist, church leader, Bible translator
 Alicia Munnell, 1964 – economist
 Helen O'Bannon, 1961 – economist
 Anne W. Patterson, 1971 – U.S. Ambassador to Egypt, former Acting U.S. Ambassador to the United Nations, former U.S. Ambassador to Pakistan
 Ruth Baker Pratt, 1898 – congresswoman from 1929 to 1933, first woman elected to Congress from New York
 Alex Poon, 2014 - transgender rights activist
 Reena Raggi, 1973 – judge of the United States Court of Appeals for the Second Circuit
 Leticia Ramos-Shahani, 1951 – former Philippine Senator, diplomat, human rights activist
 Diane Ravitch, 1960 – historian, former U.S. Assistant Secretary of Education
 Desiree Rogers, 1981 – public relations executive, White House Social Secretary
 Allyne R. Ross, 1967 – judge of the United States District Court for the Eastern District of New York
 Vanessa Ruiz, 1972 – associate judge, District of Columbia Court of Appeals
 Janna Ryan, 1991 – attorney and wife of Republican Congressman Paul Ryan 
 Michele Sison, 1981 – U.S. Ambassador to Haiti
 Sara Soffel, 1908 – judge, Alleghany County Court and Pennsylvania Courts of Common Pleas; first woman to serve as a judge in Pennsylvania.
 Tejshree Thapa, 1988 – human rights attorney, developed legal argument for prosecuting rape as a crime against humanity before the ICTY
 Kavindya Thennankoon, 2019 – Sri Lankan youth activist 
 Abigail Harrison, 2019 – founder of The Mars Generation nonprofit
 Zatae Leola Longsdorff Straw, 1883 - physician and a New Hampshire state representative
 Julieta Valls Noyes, 1984 – U.S. Ambassador to Croatia
 Lilian Wyckoff Johnson – education policy advocate
 Jocelyn Benson, 1999 – current Secretary of State, Michigan and  former dean, Wayne State University Law School (youngest dean appointed to an accredited law school)
 Dr. Michelle Au, 1999 – State Senator, Georgia (first Asian American woman appointed to Georgia State Senate)

Journalism
 Marian Burros, 1954 – New York Times food columnist and cookbook author
 Michelle Caruso-Cabrera, 1991 – reporter for CNBC, winner of an Emmy Award 
 Kimberly Dozier, 1987 – correspondent for Associated Press, winner of the Peabody Award (2008) 
 Elizabeth Drew, 1957 – political journalist
 Nikki Finke, 1975 – entertainment/media journalist, Deadline Hollywood
 Geneva Overholser, 1970 – Pulitzer Prize-winning journalist, director of the School of Journalism at the USC Annenberg School for Communication
 Page Hopkins, 1988 – journalist, co-anchor on Fox News and anchor on NBC/MSNBC 
 Robin Reisig, 1966 – print journalist, lecturer at Columbia Graduate School of Journalism
 Cokie Roberts, 1964 – senior news correspondent at National Public Radio, winner of the Emmy Award (1991) and Edward R. Murrow Award (1990),  former host at ABC This Week with Sam Donaldson & Cokie Roberts
 Ellen Levine, 1964 – media executive, former Executive Director of Hearst Magazines
 Carla Robbins, 1974 – journalist, member of the NY Times Editorial Board
 Marion K. Sanders, 1925 – journalist, editor of Harper's Magazine
 Diane Sawyer, 1967 – journalist, host of ABC Good Morning America, winner of a 2004 George Polk award for excellence in journalism
 Susan Sheehan, 1958 – journalist, winner of the Pulitzer Prize for General Non-Fiction (1983)
 Lynn Sherr, 1963 – correspondent for ABC 20/20, co-winner of the Peabody Award (1994)
 Marilyn Silverstone, 1950 – photo-journalist and Buddhist nun
 Jennifer Vanasco, 1994 – syndicated columnist and theater critic
 Linda Wertheimer, 1965 – journalist, National Public Radio, winner of the DuPont-Columbia Award (1978) for excellence in journalism
 Emily Yoffe, 1977 – journalist and regular contributor to Slate

Literature
 Harriet Stratemeyer Adams, 1914 –  author of Nancy Drew series, pen name Carolyn Keene 
 Lisa Alther, 1966 – author, novelist
 Katharine Lee Bates, 1880 – author of the words to the anthem America the Beautiful
 Carol Bly, 1951 – short story author, essayist
 Florence Converse, 1893 – author
 Diane Mott Davidson (attended but later transferred to another college),  mystery writer
 Marjory Stoneman Douglas, 1912 – conservationist and writer
 Norma Farber, 1931 – children's book writer and poet
 Rosario Ferré, 1960 – poet
 Sheila Connolly, 1972 – mystery writer
 Alex Finlayson, 1973 – playwright
 Nancy Friday, 1955 – author of My Secret Garden, an exploration of female sexuality
 Abigail Garner, 1997 – author of Families Like Mine
 Aline Carter, 1914 – poet laureate of Texas
 Shirlee Taylor Haizlip, 1959 – nonfiction writer
 Lisa Kleypas, 1986 – romance novelist, former Miss Massachusetts
 Judith Krantz, 1948 – novelist
 Helen Hooven Santmyer, 1918 – writer
 Jane Langton, 1944 – mystery writer, author of children's literature
 Kathryn Lilley, 1956 – mystery writer
 Judith Martin, 1959 – newspaper columnist (Miss Manners)
 Jean Merrill, 1945 – author and editor of children's books
 Rana Zoe Mungin, 2011 - writer and teacher
 Maude Gillette Phillips 1881 – author, educator
 Santha Rama Rau, 1945 – travel writer
 Mildred Savage, 1941 – novelist
 Grace Zia Chua, 1921 – Chinese cookbook author
 Nayantara Pandit Sahgal, 1947, novelist, niece of Jawaharlal Nehru and cousin of Indira Gandhi
 Gertrude Woodcock Seibert, 1885 - writer
 Cathy Song, 1977 – poet
 Reetika Vazirani, 1984 – poet
 Bing Xin, 1926 – Chinese poet, essayist, short-story writer
 Ann Zwinger, 1946 – natural history writer
 Ira Trivedi, 2006 – novelist
 Alyson Richman, 1994 – novelist
 Jasmine Guillory, 1997 – novelist

Media and entertainment 
 Laura Allen, 1996 – actress, All My Children, Mona Lisa Smile
 Barbara Babcock, 1960 – actress
 Blanche Baker, 1978 – Emmy-winning actress and sculptress – aka Blanche Garfein, aka Blanche Van Dusen
Kay B. Barrett, 1924 – highly influential Hollywood talent scout and agent, brought Gone with the Wind to the screen
 Lizzie Borden– filmmaker
 Debra Chasnoff, 1978 – filmmaker
 Phyllis Curtin, 1943 – opera singer
 Fazeelat Aslam, 2005 – Academy Award-winning filmmaker
 Suzanne Davis (pianist), 1976 – jazz pianist
 Jo Duffy, 1976 – editor and writer of comic books
 Amy Chu, 1990 – comic book author
Nora Ephron, 1962 – movie screenplay writer (When Harry Met Sally...), writer and director (Sleepless in Seattle and You've Got Mail)
 Nancy Friday, 1955 – author
 Angelina Weld Grimké, 1900 – playwright 
 Daisy Gardner, 1997 – television writer
 Barbara Lea, 1951 – actress and singer
 Wendy Liebman, 1983 – stand-up comedian
 Ali MacGraw, 1960 – actress
Anne Revere, 1926 – film, stage, television actress, whose career was cut short by the 1950s Communist blacklist
 Caroline Rose, 2011 – musician
 Elisabeth Shue (transferred to Harvard),  actress
 Natalie Sleeth, 1952 – composer
 Alice Stewart Trillin, 1960 – author, educator, film producer
 Michelle Yip, 1998 – Chinese actress, left before graduation to pursue an acting career in Hong Kong after winning Miss Chinese International Pageant
 Patricia Zipprodt, 1946 – Tony Award-winning costume designer 
 Mira Sethi, 2010 – Pakistani author, journalist, and actress

Science and medicine
Charlotte Fitch Roberts, class of 1880 - Professor of Chemistry, 1894-1917.  After graduating in the first Wellesley Class of 1880, she was also in the first class of women to receive a Ph.D from Yale in 1894.  She was the head of the Wellesley Chemistry Department until her death in 1917.    
Nancy Adler, 1968 - Professor of Psychology, Director of the Center for Health and Community, U.C. San Francisco. Member of National Academy of Medicine (NAM) and the American Academy of Arts and Sciences (AAAS).
Tundi Spring Agardy, 1980 – marine conservationist
 Leah Allen, M.A. class of 1912 – astronomer.
 Thelma Alper, 1929 – clinical psychologist, first Jewish woman to receive a PhD from Harvard University 
 JudyAnn Bigby, class of 1973 – Internist, Secretary of Health and Human Services (Massachusetts).
 Annie Jump Cannon, class of 1884 – studied physics and astronomy at Wellesley, astronomer, developed the well-known Harvard Classification of stars based upon temperature.
Lisa A. Carey – distinguished professor in Breast Cancer research
 Martha Stahr Carpenter, 1941 – Astronomer, three term president of AAVSO, and first women faculty member in the Cornell University College of Arts and Sciences.
 Sally Carrighar – naturalist and writer
 Florence Meier Chase, class of 1924 – botanist at the Smithsonian Astrophysical Observatory. 
 Harriet Creighton, class of 1929 – botanist, geneticist, Professor of Botany, with Barbara McClintock proved that genetic recombination occurred through chromosomal crossover.
 Dorothy Day, 1919 – plant physiologist 
 Louise Dolan, class of 1971 – mathematical physicist, cosmological and superstring theorist
 Persis Drell, class of 1977 – physicist, director of the Stanford Linear Accelerator, dean of the Stanford University School of Engineering
 Katherine Freeman, 1984 – geoscientist, chemist, editor-in-chief of the Annual Review of Earth and Planetary Sciences 
 Nina Gage, 1905 – leading teacher of modern nursing in China
 Muriel Gardiner, 1922 – psychoanalyst and psychiatrist, likely the basis for the character "Julia" in Lillian Hellman's "Pentimento"
 Winifred Goldring, 1909 – pioneering female paleontologist
 Pauline Hald, 1926 – clinical chemist at Yale 
 Judith Goslin Hall, 1961 – pediatrician and clinical geneticist
Carol Handwerker – Reinhardt Schuhmann, Jr. Professor of Materials Engineering and Environmental and Ecological Engineering at Purdue University
 Harriet Louise Hardy, 1928 – pioneer in occupational health, first woman to become a full professor at Harvard Medical School
 Abigail Harrison, 2019 – sciences advocate, Internet personality
 Martha Haynes, 1973 – radio astronomer, won the Henry Draper Award for 3D visualization of the universe
 Erna Schneider Hoover, 1932 – computer scientist, invented computer switching of telephone traffic at Bell Labs
 Dorothea Jameson, 1942 – cognitive psychologist, expert in color and vision
 Mary Jeanne Kreek, 1958 – neurobiologist, best known for her work in the development of methadone therapy for heroin addiction, was named a Fellow of the New York Academy of Sciences, received an Alumni Gold Medal Award from Columbia University College of Physicians and Surgeons for “lifetime excellence in medicine”, and was awarded a Lifetime Achievement Award from the National Institute on Drug Addiction.
 Rebecca Lancefield, 1916 – microbiologist, developed serologic classification of beta-hemolytic streptococci
 Story Landis, 1967 – neuroscientist, Director of the National Institute of Neurological Disorders and Stroke
Louise Zung-nyi Loh, 1924 – mathematician, physicist, college professor in China and US
 Nergis Mavalvala, 1990 – astrophysicist, 2010 MacArthur Foundation Fellowship, Dean of the MIT Institute of Science
 Martha McClintock, 1970 – biopsychologist, discoverer of human pheromones
Louise McDowell, 1898 - physicist, one of the first women to work at the National Bureau of Standards
 Pamela Melroy, 1983 – astronaut, space shuttle commander
 Vivian Pinn, 1963 – pathologist, Director of the Office of Research on Women's Health at the National Institutes of Health
 Mabel Seagrave, 1905 – doctor, ran a hospital in France after World War I
Isabelle Stone, 1890 - physicist, founder of the American Physical Society
Chi Che Wang, 1914 – biochemist, professor at Northwestern University and the University of Cincinnati
 Isabel Bassett Wasson, 1918 – petroleum geologist and National Park Service ranger
 Naomi Weisstein, 1961 – professor of psychology, neuroscientist, author
 Mary Allen Wilkes, 1959 – computer pioneer, one of the first people to use a home computer
 Brenda Pruden Winnewisser, 1961 – physicist, received a fellowship from the Alexander von Humboldt Foundation, has 122 research publications
 Alexandra Worden, 1992 – microbial ecologist and biologist, fellow of the Canadian Institute for Advanced Research

Other
 Carol Cadou – art curator and museum director
 Anya Corke, 2013 – chess player, Woman Grandmaster
 Julia Collins, 2005 – holds second-longest Jeopardy winning streak, best female champion 
 Isabel Darlington, 1886 – lawyer and first woman to gain admittance to the bar and practice law in Chester County, Pennsylvania 
Betty Freeman, 1942 – philanthropist, patron of contemporary classical music including John Cage, Philip Glass, and Pierre Boulez
 Asma Gull Hasan, 1997 – Muslim feminist writer, lawyer
 Mary Haskell (1873–1964)
 Nadine Netter (born 1944) - tennis player
 S. Grace Nicholes – social reformer
 AJ Odasso, 2005 - editor, educator, novelist, and poet
 Georgia Pellegrini, 2003 – author, food blogger, chef and hunter
 Elisabeth Severance Prentiss, 1880s - philanthrophist. The student dormitory, Severance Hall, is named after her
 Ruth Rowland Nichols, 1924 – aviation pioneer
 Charlotte Anita Whitney, 1889 – women's rights and political activist, suffragist, Communist Party organizer

Notable faculty

 Edith Abbott – social worker, educator, and author
 Myrtilla Avery – American classical scholar focused on Medieval art, former chair of Department of Art at Wellesley College and director of the Farnsworth Art Museum from 1930–1937. Introduced the first art history classes at Wellesley & the earliest museum studies courses.
 Emily Greene Balch – economist, peace activist, winner of the Nobel Peace Prize
 Katharine Lee Bates – author of America the Beautiful; also Wellesley College alumna.
 Judy Brown – physicist
 Carolyn Shaw Bell – economist 
 Frank Bidart – poet
 Laura Bornholdt - historian and Dean of the College
 Harriet Boyd-Hawes –  archaeologist
 Howard Mayer Brown – musicologist
 Mary Bunting – microbiologist and academic administrator
 Bryan E. Burns – archeologist
 Ellen Burrell - head of Pure Mathematics department, 1897-1916
 Alice Huntington Bushee – writer
 Mary Whiton Calkins – philosopher
 Annie Jump Cannon – astronomer
 Karl "Chip" Case – economist
 Dan Chiasson – poet
 Katharine Coman – economist
 Francis Judd Cooke – composer
 Rose Laub Coser – sociologist
 Sirarpie Der-Nersessian – art historian
 Carlos Dorrien – sculptor
 Katharine May Edwards – Professor of Greek, classics scholar
 Alicia Erian – novelist
 Alona E. Evans – political scientist
 David Ferry – poet and translator
 Edmund Barry Gaither – art historian
 Marshall Goldman – economist and author
 June Goodfield – philosopher and historian of science
 Jorge Guillén – poet
 Ellen Hildreth – computer scientist
 Kathleen Hirsch – writer
 Walter Houghton – historian of Victorian literature
 Marian E. Hubbard – zoology professor
 Nannerl O. Keohane – political theorist; president of the college 1981–1993; also Wellesley College alumna
 Philip L. Kohl – anthropologist
 Hedwig Kohn – physicist
 Mary Lefkowitz – classical scholar; also Wellesley College alumna
 Tom Lehrer –  American singer-songwriter, satirist, pianist, and mathematician
 Jon D. Levenson – theologian
 Peggy Levitt – sociology
 Margaret Eliza Maltby – physicist
 Julián Marías – philosopher
 Tony Martin – historian
 Mildred H. McAfee – former president of Wellesley College, first director of the WAVES
Louise McDowell - physicist, and first U.S. woman to work at the National Bureau of Standards
 Alison McIntyre – philosopher
 Helen Abbot Merrill – mathematician (and alumna)
 Vladimir Nabokov – author
 James F. O'Gorman – architectural historian
Julia Swift Orvis – taught history and political science from 1899 to 1941
 Alice Freeman Palmer – educator, first woman president of a nationally known college (Wellesley College)
 Josephine Preston Peabody – poet, dramatist
 Ellen Fitz Pendleton – mathematician, former president of Wellesley College, alumna
 Robert Pinsky – poet
 Adrian Piper – philosopher
 Judith Roitman – mathematician
 Richard Rorty – philosopher
 Paul J. Sachs – art historian
 Allen Sapp (composer) – musician
 Alice T. Schafer – mathematician
 Alan Schechter – political scientist
 Vida Dutton Scudder – writer, educator, welfare activist
 Mary Sears – oceanographer
 Marilyn Sides – writer
 Marion Elizabeth Stark – mathematician
 Emily Vermeule – classical scholar and archaeologist
 Claude Vigée – poet
 Alice Walker – author
 Sarah Frances Whiting –  astronomer and physicist, founder of the Whitin Observatory
 Mary Emma Woolley – Bible scholar, academic administrator
 Richard Yarde
 Mabel Minerva Young – mathematician

References

Wellesley College people